is a train station in Kita-ku, Niigata, Niigata Prefecture, Japan, operated by East Japan Railway Company (JR East).  It is also a freight terminal for the Japan Freight Railway Company.

Lines
Niizaki Station is served by the Hakushin Line, and is 9.6 kilometers from the starting point of the line at Niigata Station.

Station layout

The station consists of a side platform (1) and an island platform (2/3) serving three tracks, with the station situated above the tracks. The station has a "Midori no Madoguchi" staffed ticket office.

Platforms

History
Niizaki Station opened on 15 April 1956. With the privatization of Japanese National Railways (JNR) on 1 April 1987, the station came under the control of JR East.

Passenger statistics
In fiscal 2017, the station was used by an average of 1347 passengers daily (boarding passengers only).

Surrounding area
Niizaki Industrial Park

See also
 List of railway stations in Japan

References

External links

 JR East station information 

Railway stations in Niigata (city)
Hakushin Line
Railway stations in Japan opened in 1956
Stations of East Japan Railway Company
Stations of Japan Freight Railway Company